Eehongo is a village in the Ohangwena Region of Namibia.

Populated places in the Ohangwena Region